"Away from the Sun" is a song by American rock band 3 Doors Down. It was released on January 12, 2004, as the fourth single from their second studio album of the same name. It topped the Billboard Bubbling Under Hot 100 chart in March 2004 and peaked at  62 on the Billboard Hot 100 in August of the same year.

Composition
In an interview with SongFacts, lead singer Brad Arnold spoke about the song's meaning:"'Away from the Sun' is just about those days. A really important little phrase is at the beginning of the chorus, it says, 'Now again I found myself so far down.' It's like, yet again I've fallen. It's not like just once you're in a hole, it's like, here I am again. You watch the kid in the [music] video, it's over and over he's at the bottom again. It's like every time he crawls back up someone just pushes him down. And for about a two-to-three year period in my life, I really felt like that. I didn't even feel like climbing up the hill anymore, because every time I climbed up somebody was gonna push me back down it. That song is a reflection of that time period in my life. And thank God it's over. But I just felt away from the sun."

Music video
The music video for "Away from the Sun" was directed by Noble Jones.

The video begins with a young boy (played by Brad Arnold's nephew) attempting to climb a mountain with boulders strapped to his ankles with ropes. As he climbs, a man rushes up to him and begins scolding the boy. The boy then falls down the mountain. As he falls, a group of schoolgirls look on. Most of them laugh at him, with the exception of one girl who silently stares with a blank expression on her face. Afterwards, the boy attempts to climb the mountain again. This time, however, a group of men begin throwing stones at the boy, except for one man who stares blankly at the boy and drops his stone. The boy then sees a woman dressed in white ahead of him, but the man from earlier in the video reappears and punches him down to the base of the mountain. As he reflects on the events that had transpired, the sun begins to rise over the mountain range on the horizon. Finally, the boy once again attempts to scale the mountain. He again sees the woman dressed in white, and he continues to climb to the top of the mountain. The scene cuts to the boy climbing the mountain from afar before the sunlight consumes the screen and the video ends.

Track listings
European CD single
 "Away from the Sun" – 3:51
 "Away from the Sun" (acoustic) – 3:45

European enhanced CD single
 "Away from the Sun" – 3:51
 "Away from the Sun" (acoustic) – 3:45
 "Kryptonite (live)" – 4:11
 "Away from the Sun" (video) – 3:45

Australian CD single
 "Away from the Sun" – 3:53
 "The Road I'm On" – 4:01
 "When I'm Gone" – 4:23
 "Kryptonite" (live) – 4:11

Charts

Weekly charts

Year-end charts

Release history

References

3 Doors Down songs
2003 songs
2004 singles
Republic Records singles
Song recordings produced by Rick Parashar
Songs about depression
Songs about heartache
Songs written by Brad Arnold
Songs written by Todd Harrell
Songs written by Matt Roberts (musician)
Songs written by Chris Henderson (American musician)